The Cordillera Domeyko is a mountain range of the Andes located in northern Chile, west of Salar de Atacama. It runs north-south for approximately 600 km, parallel to the main chain. The mountain range marks the eastern border of the flat parts of Atacama Desert. The western border of Cordillera Domeyko is characterized by a inland cliffs and a sharp topographic transition known as El Bordo Escarpment. El Bordo Escarpment contain the main rock outcrops of the Purilactis Group, which make up much of the mountain range.   

Cordillera Domeyko was named after Ignacy Domeyko and is the world's lowest humidity mountain range.

References

External links 
 Virtual Tour on 360° of Cordillera de la Sal Chilexplora.com

Landforms of Antofagasta Region
Mountain ranges of Chile